Henry Townsend Vodden (10 July 1887 – 24 August 1960) was the fifth bishop of Hull in the modern era (from 1934 until 1957).

He was educated at Exeter School and Exeter College, Oxford, his first posts after ordination  were as a  missionary priest in India. He was later secretary of the CMS  before elevation to the episcopate as a suffragan to the Archbishop of York. He died on 24 August 1960.

Notes

1887 births
People educated at Exeter School
Alumni of Exeter College, Oxford
Bishops of Hull
20th-century Church of England bishops
1960 deaths